Amin Ismail Abu Hawwas (born 26 April, 1994) is  a Jordanian-American basketball player who plays for Orthodox Club and the Jordan National Team. He stands at 6'4" and plays in both shooting guard and point guard positions. Scoring champion in back to back seasons 2021/2022. Won MVP in 2022 season.

High school
Hawwas attended Cave Spring High School from 2009 to 2012 and played varsity basketball his junior and senior year. During his senior year, he led his team to the state finals. He was awarded district player of the year for the 2012 season, and regional player of the year for the 2012 season. He was selected for first team all-state for the 2012 season. He averaged 19.5 points, 7.2 rebound and 2.1 assist.

College career
Hawwas played college basketball for Mars Hill University. In his freshman season, he averaged 3.58 points, 0.33 rebound and 0.42 assist.

Professional career
Hawwas joined the Jordanian side Orthodox Basketball Club in the 2018 season.

Hawwas joined the Jordanian club  Lead league in scoring with 22.7 ppg

Hawwas signed with the Qatar side Hawwas signed with the Jordanian club Orthodox Basketball Club in 2022 season. Went on to win MVP and leading league in scoring with 26.4 ppg

National team career
Hawwas represented the Jordanian national basketball team where  in the 2016 FIBA Asia Challenge, he averaged 5.5 points, 1.9 rebounds and 1.8 assists. He played at the 2017 FIBA Asia Cup where he averaged 9 points, 3.4 rebound and 1.6 assists.
He also played at the 2019 FIBA Basketball World Cup in China, where he averaged 3.3 points, 0.5 rebound and 0 assist.

References

Living people
1994 births
American men's basketball players
American people of Jordanian descent
Basketball players from Virginia
Jordanian men's basketball players
Sportspeople from Roanoke, Virginia
2019 FIBA Basketball World Cup players